Kralice na Hané is a market town in Prostějov District in the Olomouc Region of the Czech Republic. It has about 1,700 inhabitants.

Administrative parts
The village of Kraličky is an administrative part of Kralice na Hané.

History
The first written mention of Kralice na Hané is from 1225.

References

Populated places in Prostějov District
Market towns in the Czech Republic